The Mexican roundtail chub (Gila minacae) is a cyprinid fish endemic to  Mexico.

References

Gila (fish)
Chubs (fish)
Cyprinid fish of North America
Freshwater fish of Mexico
Fish described in 1902